In France, Quebec, New Brunswick and Sweden, the président-directeur général (PDG) is the highest ranking officer in a société anonyme (SA) operating under a single-tier board of directors, i.e., without a supervisory board. The président-directeur général combines the functions of chair of the board of directors and chief executive officer (general director, or DG) within the company. The title is usually translated as simply "President" in English-speaking sources, though a more direct translation would be "President and CEO”, "Chairman and CEO" or "President and Chairman".

The PDG carries out his or her duties under the control of the assemblée générale (general assembly), which is composed of the board of directors and the shareholders.

These functions are sometimes performed by two separate individuals, often by one person in smaller companies. This combination of functions allows the PDG to have the widest powers:
 As directeur général, the PDG is responsible for the operational management of the company;
 As chair of the board, the PDG oversees the establishment of major directions in the direction of the company.
The PDG has the power to bind the company vis-à-vis third parties in the interest of the company and within the limit of the company's charter.

According to a study by the firm Proxinvest, published in 2018, 57.5% of CAC 40 companies are headed by a PDG, against only 10% of companies in the STOXX Europe 600 index. It is therefore a uniquely French executive management style.

History 
In France, the creation of the position of PDG dates to the Vichy Regime, who reformed the law of 1867 on the operation of sociétés anonymes by reinforcing the personal responsibility of the chairman of the board of directors (law of September 18, 1940) and especially by creating the function of président-directeur général, who assumes authority in the company by mixing the control functions of the president and the functions of general management, replacing the former chair of the board with a generally honorific role (Laws of November 16, 1940 and March 4, 1943). The PDG must be a physical person and is declared a "commerçant" - "trader" and therefore financially liable under the law of November 1940.

Appointment and dismissal of the président-directeur général 
The PDG is appointed and dismissed by the board of directors, he or she is revocable "ad nutum" - that is to say at any time and without cause.

Nevertheless, jurisprudence sometimes grants compensation for the benefit of the unduly dismissed PDG.

The "ad nutum" revocation prerogative recognized by the board of directors is sometimes mitigated by a so-called "golden parachute" clause included in the contract concluded between the company and its PDG, providing for automatic compensation in case of revocation.

Legal texts 
Since the passage of the Nouvelle régulation économique (NRE) - New Economic Regulation - Act of 2001, the Commercial Code distinguishes two functions (which can be exercised by one person):

 The directeur général (art. L. 225-56 I): 

 The président of the board of directors (art. L. 225-51): 

Article 225-56 II specifies that:

See also 

 Chief executive officer
 Directeur général

References 

French business law